Bayfield High School may refer to:
Bayfield High School, Dunedin in Dunedin, New Zealand
Bayfield High School (Colorado) in Bayfield, Colorado, USA
Bayfield High School (Wisconsin) in Bayfield, Wisconsin, USA